Özgür Bakar (born 16 December 1979), better known by his ring name Murat Bosporus, is a German professional wrestler of Turkish descent. He is best known for his work on the German independent circuit.

Career
Bakar was an amateur before he started a career as a professional wrestler. His debut match took place in March 2002 with the local European Wrestling Promotion. Since then he has become one of the top German wrestlers working for over 30 promotion worldwide in countries such as France, Italy, Spain, England, Switzerland, Denmark, Netherlands, Austria, among others.

In 2006 he became the first German to work for the Japanese Pro Wrestling NOAH, where he made numerous acclaimed matches. Meanwhile, he also had a tryout match with WWE and TNA while both promotions visited Germany for live events.

In 2008 he was a regular in the major African promotion World Wrestling Professionals based in South Africa working alongside Joe E. Legend who later that year invited him to tour Canada with BSE Pro.

As of 2011 he works regularly for German Stampede Wrestling and Turkish Power Wrestling.

In 2011 he teamed with his fellow TPW competitor Big Boy and Dave Finlay in Japanese promotion Smash pro wrestling. They had competed against Tajiri, Ohara and Fujiwara. Team Tajiri won the match by pinning Big Boy.

In Turkish Power Wrestling he defended his title against Joe E. Legend, Low Ki, Tom La Ruffa, Yoshihiro Tajiri and Doug Williams.

Championships and accomplishments
Championship Of Wrestling 
cOw Interstate Championship (1 time)
German Hurricane Wrestling
GHW Heavyweight Championship (2 times)
German Stampede Wrestling
GSW Breakthrough Championship (1 time)
German Wrestling Promotion
Dragonhearts Championship (1 time)
New Blood Wrestling
Winner of the 2005 NBW Dutch Masters Tournament
Power of Wrestling
POW Intercontinental Championship (1 time, current)
POW Tag Team Championship (2 times) – with Hakem Wakuur (1) and James Mason (1)
Pro Wrestling Illustrated
PWI ranked him #180 of the top 500 singles wrestlers in the PWI 500 in 2013
Turkish Power Wrestling
TPW Intercontinental Championship (1 time, current)
Westside Xtreme Wrestling
wXw Tag Team Championship (2 times) – with Wesley Croton
Wrestling School Austria
WSA European Championship (1 time)

References

External links

Profile at German Stampede Wrestling
Profile at Turkish Power Wrestling

1979 births
Living people
People from Wolfratshausen
German male professional wrestlers
Turkish professional wrestlers
21st-century professional wrestlers